Wilkes-Barre Wyoming Valley Airport  is a county-owned, public airport three miles north of Wilkes-Barre, in Luzerne County, Pennsylvania, and 10 miles south of Scranton, in Lackawanna County, Pennsylvania. The National Plan of Integrated Airport Systems for 2011–2015 categorized it as a general aviation facility. The primary airport of the Wilkes-Barre/Scranton metropolitan area is the Wilkes-Barre/Scranton International Airport (AVP).

Facilities

The airport covers 135 acres (55 ha) at an elevation of 543 feet (166 m). It has two runways: 7/25 is 3,375 by 75 feet (1,029 × 23 m) asphalt; 9/27 is 2,191 by 100 feet (668 × 30 m) asphalt and turf.

In 2011, the airport had 25,125 aircraft operations, average 68 per day: 99.5% general aviation, 0.3% military and 0.2% air taxi. 51 aircraft were then based at the airport: 98% single-engine and 2% multi-engine.

References

External links 

Airports in Pennsylvania
County airports in Pennsylvania
Transportation buildings and structures in Luzerne County, Pennsylvania